ippv or IPPV, or similar, may refer to:

 internet pay-per-view (iPPV)
 intermittent positive pressure ventilation (IPPV)
 indapyrophenidone (IPPV)

See also
 PPV (disambiguation)
 IPV (disambiguation)